Kiew Parunchai is a Thai Muay Thai fighter.

Titles and accomplishments

Muay Thai 
 Professional Boxing Association of Thailand (PAT) 
 2015 Thailand 108 lbs Champion
 2017 Thailand 112 lbs Champion
 Lumpinee Stadium 
 2017 Lumpinee Stadium 112 lbs Champion
 2018 Lumpinee Stadium 112 lbs Champion
 2018 Lumpinee Stadium 115 lbs Champion
 2017 Lumpinee Fight of the Year (July 11 vs Ongree Sor Dechaphan)
Channel 7 Boxing Stadium
 2014 Channel 7 Stadium 105 lbs Champion

Wushu 
Southeast Asian Games 
  2021 Southeast Asian Games Men's Sanda 56 kg

Fight record

|-  style="background:#cfc;"
| 2022-01-30 || Win||align=left| Petchpailin SorJor.TongPrachin || Channel 7 Stadium || Bangkok, Thailand|| Decision ||5  ||3:00 
|-  style="background:#c5d2ea;"
| 2020-12-18 || Draw ||align=left| Parnthep V.K.Khaoyai || Suk Singmawin || Songkhla, Thailand||Decision || 5 || 3:00
|-  style="background:#cfc;"
| 2020-10-25 || Win ||align=left| Petchpailin SorJor.TongPrachin || Channel 7 Stadium || Bangkok, Thailand||Decision || 5 || 3:00
|-  style="background:#fbb;"
| 2020-09-06 || Loss ||align=left|  Jomhod Eminentair || Channel 7 Stadium || Bangkok, Thailand||Decision || 5 || 3:00 
|-
! style=background:white colspan=9 |
|-  style="background:#cfc;"
| 2020-02-09|| Win ||align=left|  Jomhod Eminentair ||Srithammaracha + Kiatpetch Super Fight || Nakhon Si Thammarat, Thailand ||Decision|| 5 || 3:00
|-  style="background:#CCFFCC;"
| 2020-01-18 || Win||align=left| TeeYai Teeded99 || Lumpinee Stadium || Bangkok, Thailand|| Decision || 5 || 3:00
|-  style="background:#FFBBBB;"
| 2019-12-06 || Loss||align=left| Petchrungruang Odtuekdaeng || Lumpinee Stadium || Bangkok, Thailand|| Decision || 5 || 3:00
|-  style="background:#FFBBBB;"
| 2019-11-14 || Loss||align=left| Petchpailin Sitnumnoi || Rajadamnern Stadium || Bangkok, Thailand|| Decision || 5 || 3:00
|-  style="background:#FFBBBB;"
| 2019-08-11 || Loss ||align=left| Jomhod Eminentair || Nonthaburi Stadium || Nonthaburi, Thailand|| Decision || 5 || 3:00
|-  style="background:#FFBBBB;"
| 2019-07-02 || Loss ||align=left| Watcharapol P.K.Senchai || Lumpinee Stadium || Bangkok, Thailand|| Decision || 5 || 3:00
|-  style="background:#CCFFCC;"
| 2019-05-10 || Win||align=left| Petchamnat Sawansangmanja || Lumpinee Stadium || Bangkok, Thailand|| KO (Right High Kick)|| 3 ||
|-  style="background:#CCFFCC;"
| 2019-03-19 || Win||align=left| Petchpailin Sitnumnoi || Lumpinee Stadium || Bangkok, Thailand|| Decision || 5 || 3:00
|-  style="background:#FFBBBB;"
| 2018-08-07|| Loss ||align=left| Rungnarai Kiatmuu9 || Lumpinee Stadium || Bangkok, Thailand || Decision || 5 || 3:00
|-  style="background:#FFBBBB;"
| 2018-07-10 || Loss ||align=left| Watcharapol P.K.Senchai || Lumpinee Stadium || Bangkok, Thailand|| Decision || 5 || 3:00
|-  style="background:#CCFFCC;"
| 2018-06-15 || Win||align=left| Kazuki Osaki || Lumpinee Stadium || Bangkok, Thailand|| Decision || 5 || 3:00 
|-
! style=background:white colspan=9 |
|-  style="background:#CCFFCC;"
| 2018-05-01 || Win||align=left| Kompetch Sitsarawatsuer || Lumpinee Stadium || Bangkok, Thailand|| Decision (Split) || 5 || 3:00 
|-
! style=background:white colspan=9 |
|-  style="background:#CCFFCC;"
| 2018-03-06 || Win||align=left| Watcharapol P.K.Senchai || Lumpinee Stadium || Bangkok, Thailand|| Decision || 5 || 3:00 
|-
! style=background:white colspan=9 |
|-  style="background:#CCFFCC;"
| 2018-01-23 || Win||align=left| Ongree Sor Dechaphan || Lumpinee Stadium || Bangkok, Thailand|| Decision || 5 || 3:00
|-  style="background:#FFBBBB;"
| 2017-07-11 || Loss||align=left| Ongree Sor Dechaphan || Lumpinee Stadium || Bangkok, Thailand|| Decision || 5 || 3:00
|-  style="background:#FFBBBB;"
| 2017-06-09 || Loss||align=left| Ongree Sor Dechaphan || Lumpinee Stadium || Bangkok, Thailand|| Decision || 5 || 3:00 
|-
! style=background:white colspan=9 |
|-  style="background:#FFBBBB;"
| 2017-05-05 || Loss||align=left| Saoek Kesagym || Lumpinee Stadium || Bangkok, Thailand|| Decision || 5 || 3:00
|-  style="background:#CCFFCC;"
| 2017-03-07 || Win||align=left| Banlungngoen Sawansangmanja || Lumpinee Stadium || Bangkok, Thailand|| Decision || 5 || 3:00 
|-
! style=background:white colspan=9 |
|-  style="background:#CCFFCC;"
| 2016-12-09 || Win||align=left| Petchpailin Sitnumnoi || Lumpinee Stadium || Bangkok, Thailand|| Decision || 5 || 3:00
|-
! style=background:white colspan=9 |
|-  style="background:#CCFFCC;"
| 2016-11-15 || Win||align=left| Ongree Sor Dechaphan || Lumpinee Stadium || Bangkok, Thailand|| Decision || 5 || 3:00
|-  style="background:#CCFFCC;"
| 2016-09-23 || Win||align=left| Rit Jitmuangnon ||  || Pa Tong, Thailand|| Decision || 5 || 3:00 
|-
! style=background:white colspan=9 |
|-  style="background:#CCFFCC;"
| 2016-08-05 || Win||align=left|  Peemai Erewan ||  || Songkhla, Thailand|| Decision || 5 || 3:00
|-  style="background:#FFBBBB;"
| 2016-06-26 || Loss||align=left|  Ongree Sor Dechaphan || Lumpinee Stadium || Songkhla, Thailand|| Decision || 5 || 3:00
|-  style="background:#CCFFCC;"
| 2016-04-24 || Win||align=left| Detchaiya PetchyindeeAcademy || Rajadamnern Stadium || Bangkok, Thailand|| KO|| 4 ||
|-  style="background:#c5d2ea;"
| 2016-03-28 || Draw||align=left| Detchaiya PetchyindeeAcademy ||  || Nakhon Si Thammarat, Thailand|| Decision || 5 || 3:00
|-  style="background:#CCFFCC;"
| 2016-02-01 || Win||align=left| Priewpark Sor.Jor.Vichitpedriew || Rajadamnern Stadium || Bangkok, Thailand|| Decision || 5 || 3:00
|-  style="background:#FFBBBB;"
| 2015-12-04 || Loss||align=left| Virachat Boonrasi || Lumpinee Stadium || Bangkok, Thailand|| Decision || 5 || 3:00
|-  style="background:#FFBBBB;"
| 2015-11-03 || Loss||align=left| Rit Jitmuangnon || Lumpinee Stadium || Bangkok, Thailand|| Decision || 5 || 3:00
|-  style="background:#CCFFCC;"
| 2015-09-11 || Win||align=left| Den Sor.Ploenchit || Lumpinee Stadium || Bangkok, Thailand|| Decision || 5 || 3:00
|-  style="background:#FFBBBB;"
| 2015-06-05 || Loss||align=left| Singhaudorn Audaudorn || Lumpinee Stadium || Bangkok, Thailand|| KO || 4 ||
|-  style="background:#CCFFCC;"
| 2015-05-30 || Win||align=left| Petchwichit Sor.Jor.Vichitpedriew|| Rangsit Stadium || Thailand||Decision || 5 || 3:00
|-  style="background:#FFBBBB;"
| 2015-04-29 || Loss||align=left| Rit Jitmuangnon || Lumpinee Stadium || Bangkok, Thailand|| Decision || 5 || 3:00
|-  style="background:#CCFFCC;"
| 2015-04-03 || Win||align=left| Koko Paeminburi || Lumpinee Stadium || Bangkok, Thailand|| Decision || 5 || 3:00
|-  style="background:#CCFFCC;"
| 2014-12-28 || Win||align=left| Priewpark Yodaswintransport  || Channel 7 Stadium || Bangkok, Thailand|| Decision || 5 || 3:00 
|-
! style=background:white colspan=9 |
|-  style="background:#CCFFCC;"
| 2014-11-21 || Win||align=left|   || Lumpinee Stadium || Bangkok, Thailand|| Decision || 5 || 3:00
|-  style="background:#CCFFCC;"
| 2014-10-31 || Win||align=left| Chailar Por.Lakboon  || Lumpinee Stadium || Bangkok, Thailand|| Decision || 5 || 3:00
|-  style="background:#CCFFCC;"
| 2014-10-06 || Win||align=left| Chatchai P.K.Saenchai  || Lumpinee Stadium || Bangkok, Thailand|| Decision || 5 || 3:00
|-  style="background:#FFBBBB;"
| 2014-09-07 || Loss||align=left| Den Sor.Ploenchit  || Channel 7 Stadium || Bangkok, Thailand|| Decision || 5 || 3:00 
|-
| colspan=9 | Legend:

References

Kiew Parunchai
Kiew Parunchai
Living people
1997 births
Kiew Parunchai
Southeast Asian Games medalists in wushu
Competitors at the 2021 Southeast Asian Games
Kiew Parunchai